Gustavo Adolfo Torres Grueso (born 15 June 1996) is a Colombian professional footballer who plays as a forward for América de Cali.

Career

National team

Torres represented Colombia for the 2013 South American Under-17 Football Championship held in Argentina. On April 2, 2013 Torres scored his first goal with the national U-17 team against Paraguay in a match that ended 1–1.

References

1996 births
Living people
Colombian footballers
Colombia youth international footballers
Colombia under-20 international footballers
Colombian expatriate footballers
Categoría Primera A players
Categoría Primera B players
Argentine Primera División players
Boca Juniors de Cali footballers
Deportes Quindío footballers
Universitario Popayán footballers
Atlético Nacional footballers
San Lorenzo de Almagro footballers
Águilas Doradas Rionegro players
CR Vasco da Gama players
América de Cali footballers
Association football midfielders
Colombian expatriate sportspeople in Argentina
Colombian expatriate sportspeople in Brazil
Expatriate footballers in Argentina
Expatriate footballers in Brazil
Sportspeople from Valle del Cauca Department